P.O.W.: Prisoners of War, released in Japan as , is a side-scrolling beat 'em up game produced by SNK and originally released as an arcade game in 1988.

A home version was released for the Nintendo Entertainment System on June 30, 1989, in Japan and in September in North America. The game takes place during the Cold War where player control a duo of military prisoners who break free from their cell to relentlessly fight their way into the main base of their adversaries in order to eliminate their leader and escape for their lives.

Gameplay
As a lone wolf, or as partners, the mission objective is to escape from the enemy's base by fighting through four stages filled with numerous types of enemy soldiers trying to impede the player's escape. The stages consist of a POW camp, a warehouse, a jungle, and the enemy's base. Occasionally the enemy will attack the player with vehicles such as an assault chopper, an armored truck or motorcycles. At the end of the final stage, the player confronts an enemy general before being picked up by the extraction chopper proceeding to the final escape sequence.

The game can be played by up to two players simultaneously:
 Player 1 controls a P.O.W. dressed in a navy blue guerilla-warfare uniform named Snake (スネーク, Sunēku).
 Player 2 controls a palette swap of the same character dressed in a blood red guerilla-warfare uniform who is named Bart (バート, Bāto).

The controls consists of an eight-way joystick for moving the character and three action buttons for punching, kicking, and jumping. There are also three special attacks performed by pressing two buttons simultaneously: a jump kick (jump, and then kick), a back punch (jump and punch simultaneously), and a headbutt (punch and kick simultaneously). The player can also pick up one of two weapons dropped by defeated enemies: a throwing knife and a machine gun. The controls changes while wielding a weapon. The knife is thrown by pressing the punch button, but can be preserved by the player until needed by using kicks. When wielding the machine gun, the player can fire it by pressing the kick button or conserve its ammo by pressing the punch button to gun whip enemies.

NES version
Unlike the arcade version, the NES version is single-player only, meaning that the player takes control of Bart. The premise of the game remains the same, but the controls are changed due to the lack of a third action button. The jump kick is performed by pressing punch and kick simultaneously (B and A), while the back-punch is performed by holding the d-pad on the player's opposite direction and pressing B at the same time (the headbutt is the only combination attack removed in the NES version). However, the player has the ability to pick up and use hand grenades (which were only used by enemy characters in the arcade version) during the boss encounters against the helicopter in Stage 1 and the tank in Stage 4. There are also new enemy characters (such as frogmen, shotgun wielders, and a fat strongman), as well as a new final boss.

There are also huts and rooms where the player can obtain power-ups by defeating the enemies inside. The power-ups consists of a full life recovery, a brass knuckle that increases the player's punch strength, and an armor that makes the player invulnerable to gunshots and knife throws.

Reception
Commodore User'''s Nick Kelly wrote that the arcade game was faithful to Double Dragon and Renegade before it and called it a "good solid beat 'em up", rating it a 6 out of 10. In Japan, Game Machine listed P.O.W.: Prisoners of War on their December 15, 1988 issue as being the third most-successful table arcade unit of the month.

Re-release
The game was included in the SNK 40th Anniversary Collection'' in 2019.

References

External links
 POW manual
 

1988 video games
Arcade video games
Side-scrolling beat 'em ups
Nintendo Entertainment System games
Nintendo Switch games
PlayStation Network games
PlayStation 4 games
SNK Playmore games
SNK beat 'em ups
Video games scored by Kikuko Hataya
Prisoners of war in popular culture
Video games developed in Japan
Hamster Corporation games